Daniel Holdsworth may refer to:

 Daniel Holdsworth (musician) (born 1981), Australian musician and composer
 Daniel Holdsworth (rugby league) (born 1984), Australian rugby league player